Aforia hedleyi is a species of sea snail, a marine gastropod mollusk in the family Cochlespiridae.

Distribution
This species occurs in Antarctic waters at a depth between 498 m and 569 m.

References

 Dell, R. K. 1990. Antarctic Mollusca with Special Reference to the Fauna of the Ross Sea. Bull. R. Soc. N.Z. 27: 1-311

External links

  Kantor Y.I., Harasewych M.G. & Puillandre N. (2016). A critical review of Antarctic Conoidea (Neogastropoda). Molluscan Research. DOI: 10.1080/13235818.2015.1128523

hedleyi
Gastropods described in 1990